LSSP may refer to:
 Lainingthou Sanamahi Sana Pung
 Lanka Sama Samaja Party